Truax Field may refer to:

 Dane County Regional Airport in Dane County, Wisconsin, United States
 Truax Field Air National Guard Base, an Air National Guard facility located at Dane Co. Regional Airport
 Naval Air Station Corpus Christi in Corpus Christi, Texas, United States